Zhang Honghe is a lieutenant general (zhong jiang) and Deputy Commander of the Chinese People's Liberation Army Air Force (PLAAF). He was elevated to the rank of air force lieutenant general on 16 July 2014. He formerly served as President of the PLA Air Force Engineering University (AFEU) in Xi'an, which is under the jurisdiction of the Ministry of National Defense.

References

Living people
People's Liberation Army Air Force generals
1954 births
People from Fuyang
Generals from Anhui
People's Liberation Army generals from Anhui